Alastair James Johnston (born July 1948) is a former chairman of Rangers. He is a native Glaswegian who divides his time between Glasgow and the USA where he has business interests. Johnston his best known for his time as chairman of Scottish side Rangers, where he is still a non-executive director.

Business career
A graduate of the University of Strathclyde, he obtained an Accountancy degree. In 2004, he was awarded Alumnus of the Year.

He holds the posts of vice-chairman and member of the board of directors of International Management Group (IMG), the leading international sports and entertainment group. His first client was Grand Slam champion pro golfer Gary Player, whom he has remained close to ever since.

Football
Glasgow-born Johnston is a lifelong Rangers fan who made his name working for the late Mark McCormack, founder of IMG, and  became a Rangers director in 2004. He succeeded David Murray as Rangers chairman on 26 August 2009. However, Johnston was removed by new owner of Rangers Craig Whyte on 24 May 2011. In June 2017, over six years after leaving, Johnston returned to the club as a director of Plc board.

References 

Scottish expatriates in the United States
Chairmen and investors of football clubs in Scotland
Rangers F.C. chairmen
Businesspeople from Glasgow
1948 births
Living people
Alumni of the University of Strathclyde
People educated at Grove Academy
Rangers F.C. non-playing staff
20th-century Scottish businesspeople
21st-century Scottish businesspeople